Civilian Drone Strike is a 2017 artwork by Banksy. The work depicts three General Atomics MQ-1 Predator drones flying above a child's drawing of a bombed house with a child and pet looking on at the destruction. The piece was donated to the Art the Arms Fair gallery and was exhibited to coincide with the 2017 DSEI arms fair. The work sold for £205,000. Proceeds from the sale have been donated to Campaign Against Arms Trade and Reprieve.

References

Works by Banksy